Guy Darrell Hufford (1901-1984) was a professional football player in the National Football League. In 1926, he played for the Los Angeles Buccaneers, a traveling team based in Chicago.

Notes

References
Pro Football Archives: Player Profile

1901 births
1984 deaths
Players of American football from Los Angeles
California Golden Bears football players
Los Angeles Buccaneers players